Roses or Flowers are one of the four suits of playing cards used in a Swiss deck along with Shields, Acorns and Bells. This suit was invented in 15th century German speaking Switzerland and is a survivor from a large pool of experimental suit signs created to replace the Latin suits.

Characteristics 
The rose is represented by a stylised yellow flower, with six leaves and an orange pistil.

In German, the suit is called Rosen.

Cards 
The following images depict the suit of Roses from an 1850 Swiss-suited pack:

See also 
 Swiss playing cards
 Card suit

References

Card suits